Soun Veasna (born March 27, 1994 in Cambodia) is a footballer for Electricite du Cambodge in the Cambodian League.

He has represented Cambodia at senior international level.

Honours

Club
Svay Rieng
Cambodian League: 2013
Hun Sen Cup: 2011, 2012, 2015

References

External links
 

1994 births
Living people
Cambodian footballers
Cambodia international footballers
Preah Khan Reach Svay Rieng FC players
Association football midfielders